Laura Welsh is a Scottish lawn bowler.

Bowls career
In 2018 she won the Scottish National Bowls Championships singles title . After winning the 2018 Scottish National singles title she subsequently won the singles at the British Isles Bowls Championships in 2019.

References

Scottish female bowls players
Living people
Year of birth missing (living people)